The 1909 Purdue Boilermakers football team was an American football team that represented Purdue University during the 1909 college football season. In their second season under head coach Frederick A. Speik, the Boilermakers compiled a 2–5 record, finished in last place in the Western Conference with an 0–4 record against conference opponents, and were outscored by their opponents by a total of 147 to 72. F. W. Eggeman was the team captain.

Schedule

References

Purdue
Purdue Boilermakers football seasons
Purdue Boilermakers football